Regional Council elections were held in Réunion in 2004 as part of the French regional elections. The result was a victory for the Communist Party of Réunion–Free Dom alliance, which won 27 of the 45 seats.

Results

References

Reunion
Reunion
Elections in Réunion
2004 in Réunion